Thomas Moriggl (born 23 February 1981 in Schlanders) is an Italian cross-country skier who has competed since 2000. At the 2010 Winter Olympics, he finished 24th in both the 15 km and 30 km mixed pursuit events.

Moriggl also finished 36th in the 50 km event at the FIS Nordic World Ski Championships 2005 in Oberstdorf. His best World Cup finish was third on two occasions (2004: 30 km, 2005: 15 km).

Thomas Moriggl is the brother of fellow Olympic cross-country skier Barbara Moriggl, and lives in Schlinig, Vinschgau.

Cross-country skiing results
All results are sourced from the International Ski Federation (FIS).

Olympic Games

World Championships

World Cup

Season standings

Individual podiums
2 podiums

References

External links
 Official website
 

1981 births
Cross-country skiers at the 2010 Winter Olympics
Germanophone Italian people
Italian male cross-country skiers
Tour de Ski skiers
Living people
Olympic cross-country skiers of Italy
People from Schlanders
Cross-country skiers of Fiamme Gialle
Sportspeople from Südtirol